Dahin may refer to:

 Daheen, a popular dessert in Iraq
 Strained yogurt
 Dahin, Iran, a village in Tehran Province, Iran